Samuel Prioleau was the twenty-sixth mayor of Charleston, South Carolina, serving from 1824 to 1825.

In 1820, Prioleau was elected to serve as a representative in the South Carolina House of Representatives for Charleston. He was well suited for service on the Judiciary Committee given his legal training. In 1825, he was made Recorder of the City by the City Council of Charleston.

His son, Charles K. Prioleau, was a cotton merchant who became the primary financial agent for the Confederacy in England during the American Civil War.

References

Mayors of Charleston, South Carolina
South Carolina Federalists
Members of the South Carolina House of Representatives